Bryan Mendoza (born 14 March 1993) is an Italian professional footballer who plays as a lateral derecho for Bulgarian club Botev Vratsa.

Career
Mendoza started his career with Sacachispas. He stayed with the club in Primera C Metropolitana for three years from 2012, prior to joining Deportivo Armenio. Five appearances followed in the 2016 Primera B Metropolitana as they suffered relegation. Mendoza sealed a return to Sacachispas in June 2016, with the club gaining promotion to Primera B Metropolitana in his first campaign back. After featuring thirty-two times in 2017–18, which took his tally to one hundred and twenty-eight games and nine goals. Mendoza moved to Barracas Central in June 2018. His debut came in May 2019 in a loss to All Boys.

Ahead of the 2019–20 season, Mendoza headed off to Romania to sign with Botoșani of Liga I. He made five appearances across the 2019–20 campaign, though just one of which was as a starter; versus Astra Giurgiu on 10 July 2020. On 31 August, days after making his UEFA Europa League bow in a first round qualifier against Ordabasy, Mendoza was loaned to Liga II club Petrolul Ploiești for one season. After ten appearances, nine of which were as a starter, his loan was terminated in January 2021. In July 2022 Mendoza joined Bulgarian team Botev Vratsa.

Career statistics
.

Honours
Sacachispas
Primera C Metropolitana: 2016–17

Barracas Central
Primera B Metropolitana: 2018–19

References

External links

1993 births
Living people
Place of birth missing (living people)
Italian footballers
Association football midfielders
Italian expatriate footballers
Expatriate footballers in Argentina
Expatriate footballers in Romania
Expatriate footballers in Bulgaria
Italian expatriate sportspeople in Argentina
Italian expatriate sportspeople in Romania
Primera C Metropolitana players
Primera B Metropolitana players
Liga I players
Liga II players
First Professional Football League (Bulgaria) players
Sacachispas Fútbol Club players
Deportivo Armenio footballers
Barracas Central players
FC Botoșani players
FC Petrolul Ploiești players
CS Academica Recea players
FC Botev Vratsa players